Dundonald was a British four-masted steel barque measuring 2,205 gross register tons launched in Belfast in 1891. It was involved in a wreck in 1907 in the New Zealand Subantarctic Islands. Only 15 of its 28 crew survived; they were rescued seven months later by a scientific expedition.

Wreck 
After setting sail from Sydney, Australia, bound for Falmouth, Cornwall, United Kingdom on 17 February 1907 with a cargo of wheat, the ship was forced onto rocks during a squall on 7 March 1907 on the west coast of Disappointment Island, 5 miles northwest of the Auckland Islands of New Zealand, and sank.

Shipwrecked crew 

Only 17 members of the 28 crew managed to escape the wreck and reach shore. One man, Walter Low, made the shore but slipped off the cliff back into the sea and was never seen again. Another, the mate Jabez Peters, died of exposure on 25 March 1907, eighteen days after the disaster. He was buried in the sand, but in November 1907, members of the 's crew exhumed his body and re-interred it at the Hardwicke cemetery at Port Ross, in Erebus Cove, in the Auckland Islands; Peters' father and brother were also lost at sea in New Zealand waters.

The crew included:

 Captain J.T. Thorburn – drowned
 James Thorburn, the Captain's son – drowned
 Jabez Peters, first mate – died of exposure on the island
 Daniel McLaughlin, second mate – survived
 Karl Knudsen, third mate – survived
 William Smith, steward – drowned
 Thomas Crawford, sailmaker – drowned
 Edward Lee, carpenter – drowned
 Charles Eyre of London, able bodied seaman – survived
 Arthur Iviney, ordinary seaman – survived
 John Judge of Ireland, a Santiago marine – survived
 Albert Roberts, cabinboy – survived
 Alfred Finlow (also known as Finlon) – survived
 John Gratton – survived
 Harry Walters – survived
 John Puhohe – survived
 Herriman Querfelt – survived
 Robert Ellis of Adelaide, Australia – survived
 Jack (John) Stewart of England – survived 
 John Trotton – survived
 Michael Pul (also known as Michael Poole), a Russian Finn – survived
 Sam Watson – drowned
 Carl Anderson – drowned
 Holdersen – drowned
 Immanuel Naveati – drowned
 James Cromarty – drowned
 H. Larquer Boloom – drowned
 Walter Low – slipped off the cliff back into the sea after reaching shore on the night of the shipwreck and was never seen again

Survival 

For the first three days they ate raw mollymawks until their supply of matches dried enough to get a fire going. They kept the same fire burning for the rest of their stay on the island, burrowed into the ground for shelter. The island had limited timber and their canvas tent could not withstand the constant storms that struck the island, so they improvised by digging into the ground and roofing over the hole they made with sod and shelter. The survivors also improvised clothes and tools from materials salvaged from the wreck or made from seals and the limited number of trees they found on the island.

They built a coracle and oars from branches and ship′s canvas to try to reach it. The first attempt in August landed three men on Auckland Island, but they failed to locate the depot. The coracle was smashed on launching in the second attempt. The men built another coracle, and in October, four of the crew landed on Auckland Island. The coracle was smashed on landing. The four crew hiked their way through rough terrain to reach Port Ross, where they located the food depot and a boat. The boat had no sails, so the castaways cut up their clothes for sails and ferried the remainder of the 15 men to Ross Harbour.

Rescue 
The castaways eventually were rescued by NZGSS Hinemoa, captained by John Bollons. On 16 November 1907, Hinemoa arrived at Port Ross to refresh the depot and to drop off some members of the 1907 Sub-Antarctic Islands Scientific Expedition. On arriving at the port, Hinemoa′s crew and passengers noticed that the government depot flag was flying at half mast - an indication of a shipwrecked crew. Captain Bollons launched a boat and, after landing, found the castaways.

Captain Bollons took only one of the crew off the island at that point. He asked Charles Eyre to act as cook for the expedition group intending to stay on Campbell Island for the remaining outward leg of the voyage to the Bounty Islands and Campbell Islands. The rest of the castaways were supplied with additional stores and were told the Hinemoa would call for them on the return trip.

When Hinemoa returned, the scientists on board asked the crew to bring the remaining coracle and various other articles with them to New Zealand. The coracle was exhibited at the Canterbury Museum in Christchurch, New Zealand, to raise funds for the benefit of the survivors. The survivors also received money from the Shipwreck Relief Society.

References

External links 
 Photo of the coracle
 'The Castaways of Disappointment Island'
 

1891 ships
Ships built in Belfast
Barques
Shipwrecks of the Auckland Islands
Maritime incidents in 1907
1907 in New Zealand
1907 in Antarctica
Four-masted ships
Windjammers
1907 disasters in New Zealand